The Amance (or Mance) is a river that traverses the departments of Haute-Marne and Haute-Saône in eastern France. It rises in Celsoy and flows generally east to join the Saône at Jussey.

References

Rivers of France
Rivers of Haute-Marne
Rivers of Haute-Saône
Rivers of Grand Est
Rivers of Bourgogne-Franche-Comté